Redcar and Cleveland Borough Council is the local authority of Redcar and Cleveland. It is a unitary authority, having the powers of a non-metropolitan county and district council combined.

Political control 

Since 1995 political control of the council has been held by the following parties:

References

External links 
 Redcar & Cleveland Borough Council. Official website.

Leader and cabinet executives
Unitary authority councils of England
Local education authorities in England
Local authorities in North Yorkshire
Billing authorities in England
Redcar and Cleveland